Veritate may refer to :

The star 14 Andromedae.
Caritas in Veritate (Latin: Charity in Truth) is the third encyclical of Pope Benedict XVI.
De Veritate is a major work of Edward Herbert, 1st Baron Herbert of Cherbury.
Quaestiones disputatae de Veritate is one of the works by Thomas Aquinas.
Salva veritate substitution, from the Latin for "saving the truth", refers to two expressions that can be interchanged without changing the truth-value of the statements in which they occur.